Harvey Haddix, Jr. (September 18, 1925 – January 8, 1994) was an American professional baseball left-handed pitcher and pitching coach, who played in Major League Baseball (MLB) for the St. Louis Cardinals (1952–1956), Philadelphia Phillies (1956–57), Cincinnati Redlegs (1958), Pittsburgh Pirates (1959–1963), and Baltimore Orioles (1964–65).

Haddix was born in Medway, Ohio, located just outside Springfield. He was nicknamed "The Kitten" in St. Louis for his resemblance to Harry "The Cat" Brecheen, a left-hander on the Cardinals during Haddix's rookie campaign.

Haddix is most notable for pitching 12 perfect innings in a game against the Milwaukee Braves on May 26, 1959; the Pirates lost the game in the 13th inning.

Haddix enjoyed his best season in 1953, pitching for the Cardinals. He compiled a 20-9 record with 163 strikeouts, a 3.06 earned run average (ERA), 19 complete games, and six shutouts. After five-plus seasons with the Cardinals, Haddix was traded to the Phillies. He also pitched for Cincinnati and Pittsburgh, and finished his pitching career as an effective reliever with the Orioles. Haddix was on the Pirate team that won the 1960 World Series, and was the winning pitcher of Game Seven, pitching in relief as the Pirates’ Bill Mazeroski clubbed a  walk-off home run in the bottom of the ninth.

Near-perfect game

Haddix took a perfect game into the 13th inning against the Milwaukee Braves on May 26, 1959. He retired 36 consecutive batters in 12 innings, essentially relying on two pitches: fastball and slider. However, Braves pitcher Lew Burdette was also pitching a shutout, which was seriously jeopardized on only three occasions: the 3rd inning, when a base-running blunder negated three consecutive singles; the 9th, when Pittsburgh finally advanced a runner as far as third base; and the 10th, when pinch hitter Dick Stuart came within a few feet of ending Burdette's shutout bid with a two-run homer.

A fielding error by third baseman Don Hoak ended the perfect game in the bottom of the 13th, with the leadoff batter for Milwaukee, Félix Mantilla, reaching first base.  Mantilla then advanced to second on a sacrifice bunt by Eddie Mathews, which was followed by an intentional walk to Hank Aaron. Joe Adcock then hit an apparent home run, ending the no-hitter and the game. However, in the confusion, Aaron left the basepaths and was passed by Adcock for the second out and the Braves won 2-0.  Eventually the hit was changed from a home run to a double by a ruling from National League (NL) president Warren Giles; ultimately, only Mantilla's run counted, resulting in a final score of 1-0, but the Pirates and Haddix still lost.

Haddix's -inning, one-hit complete game, against the team that had just represented the NL in the previous two World Series, is considered by many to be the best pitching performance in MLB history. Mazeroski later said of Haddix's dominance in the game, "Usually you have one or two great or spectacular defensive plays in these no-hitters. Not that night. It was the easiest game I ever played in."

After the game, Haddix received many letters of congratulations and support, as well as one from a Texas A&M fraternity which read, in its entirety on university stationery, "Dear Harvey, Tough shit." "It made me mad", recounted Haddix, "until I realized they were right. That's exactly what it was."

In 1991, Major League Baseball changed the definition of a no-hitter to "a game in which a pitcher or pitchers complete a game of nine innings or more without allowing a hit." This retroactively disqualified Haddix, which some had considered to have thrown a perfect game because he retired the first 27 batters in order. Despite his having thrown more perfect innings than anyone in a single game, Haddix's game was taken off the lists of perfect games and no-hitters. Haddix's response was "It's O.K.  I know what I did."

In May 1989, Milwaukee's Bob Buhl revealed that the Braves pitchers had been stealing signs from Pittsburgh catcher Smokey Burgess, who was exposing his hand signals due to a high crouch. From their bullpen, Braves pitchers repeatedly repositioned a towel to signal for a fastball or a breaking ball, the only two pitches Haddix used in the game. Despite this assistance, the Milwaukee offense managed just one hit. All but one Milwaukee hitter, Aaron, took the signals.

Career
Over his 14-year career, Haddix had a 136-113 record with 1,575 strikeouts, a 3.63 ERA, 99 complete games, 21 shutouts, 21 saves, and 2,235 innings pitched in 453 games (285 as a starter). He was in the spotlight in the 1960 World Series against the Yankees. After winning Game 5 as a starter, Haddix relieved late in Game 7 and was credited with the win when Bill Mazeroski hit his Series-ending famous walk-off home run. Haddix went 2-0 in the 1960 Series, with a 2.45 ERA.

As a hitter, Haddix was better than average, posting a .212 batting average (169-for-798) with 95 runs, 37 doubles, 9 triples, 4 home runs, 64 RBI, 4 stolen bases and 46 bases on balls. Defensively, he recorded a .957 fielding percentage which was the league average at his position.

Jim Palmer said he learned a lot about pitching from Haddix during the veteran's time with the Orioles.

Haddix later followed his namesake Brecheen into the ranks of major league pitching coaches, working with the New York Mets, Cincinnati Reds, Boston Red Sox, Cleveland Indians, and Pirates for 14 years spanning 1966 to 1984.

Death
He died from emphysema in 1994 in Springfield, Ohio, at the age of 68.

Highlights
 3-time All-Star (1953–1955)
 3-time Gold Glove Award (1958–1960)
 Co-Player of the Month for May 1959
 Major League record, Most consecutive batters retired in one game (36) achieved on May 26, 1959

Tributes
Haddix's near-perfect game is memorialized by The Baseball Project, whose song, "Harvey Haddix", appears on their debut album, Volume 1: Frozen Ropes and Dying Quails (2008).

Haddix Field, the Little League baseball park in New Carlisle, Ohio, is named for Haddix.

References

External links

Harvey Haddix at SABR (Baseball BioProject)
Greatest Baseball Moments, at ESPN
Baseball's 25 Greatest Moments: Haddix's Perfect Loss

1925 births
1994 deaths
Baltimore Orioles players
Baseball coaches from Ohio
Baseball players from Ohio
Boston Red Sox coaches
Cincinnati Redlegs players
Cincinnati Reds coaches
Cleveland Indians coaches
Columbus Red Birds players
Deaths from emphysema
Gold Glove Award winners
Major League Baseball pitchers
Major League Baseball pitching coaches
National League All-Stars
New York Mets coaches
People from Clark County, Ohio
Philadelphia Phillies players
Pittsburgh Pirates coaches
Pittsburgh Pirates players
St. Louis Cardinals players
Winston-Salem Cardinals players